The Ministry of Defence (formerly 인민무력성/人民武力省 or Ministry of the People's Armed Forces) is the government agency tasked with general administrative and logistical coordination of the Korean People's Army (KPA). Prior to 1992, it was under the direct control of supreme commander and president, with guidance from the National Defence Commission and the Workers' Party Central Military Commission. The 1992 amendment to the Constitution of North Korea shifts its control to the National Defence Commission. The 2016 amendment shifted its control to the State Affairs Commission. The current Minister of National Defence is General Kang Sun-nam.

History
Until December 1972, the Minister of the People's Armed Forces was called the Minister of National Defence (민족보위상). It then changed to the Ministry of the People's Armed Forces.

Duties
The Ministry of Defence is essentially an umbrella agency gathering the KPA's logistical, political, and personnel components. The ministry also has departments which coordinate relations with foreign militaries, as well as regulating Government-owned corporations related to the defence industry and other foreign currency earning ventures. 

The ministry, through the General Staff Department is responsible for the daily operational planning and management of the KPA's ground, naval, and air commands. It develops strategy, conducts education and training, conveys the orders and guidance of the KPA Supreme Command and completes certain signals intelligence tasks.

Departments
The Ministry of National Defence contains the following departments:

General Political Bureau
General Staff Department
Security Command

Both the Director of the General Political Bureau and Chief of the General Staff have more power than the Minister.

Ministers of Defence

|-style="text-align:center;"
|colspan=8|Unknown(12 May 2015 – 11 July 2015)
|-

See also

Supreme Commander of the Armed Forces of North Korea
General Staff Department of the Korean People's Army
General Political Bureau of the Korean People's Army

References

North Korea
Politics of North Korea
Government of North Korea
Military of North Korea
North Korean entities subject to the U.S. Department of the Treasury sanctions